Evelyn Ng (born September 14, 1975 in Toronto, Ontario) is a Canadian professional poker player.  She lives in Toronto, Ontario, Canada.

Early life
Ng began her gaming career playing pool for money at age 14. By age 17, she had expanded into dealing blackjack and poker games in her hometown of Toronto. Around that time, she dated fellow Canadian poker player Daniel Negreanu. He helped her develop a style of play designed to combat aggressive players.

Poker career
Ng achieved fame on the World Poker Tour (WPT) circuit in 2003 after placing second to Clonie Gowen in the Ladies' Night I tournament, finishing ahead of established professionals including Annie Duke, Kathy Liebert and Jennifer Harman.

Ng was included as one of the characters in the video game Stacked with Daniel Negreanu. Formerly a representative of the online poker room PokerStars, she is now part of Team Bodog. Ng was a participant in the King of Vegas television series on SpikeTV, and featured in the second series of British game show Casino as the poker croupier.  She also appeared on Criss Angel Mindfreak as a professional poker player.  Criss, having little experience in poker, attempted to psychologically persuade Ng to repeatedly pick a losing hand from a set of covered/open cards.

As of 2010, her total live tournament winnings exceed $375,000.

References

External links

Twitch Channel
Official Myspace
Team Bodog profile
World Poker Tour profile

1975 births
Living people
Canadian poker players
Canadian people of Chinese descent
Female poker players
Sportspeople from Las Vegas
Sportspeople from Toronto